Solitary fibrous tumor (SFT), also known as fibrous tumor of the pleura, is a rare mesenchymal tumor originating in the pleura or at virtually any site in the soft tissue including seminal vesicle. Approximately 78% to 88% of SFT's are benign and 12% to 22% are malignant. The World Health Organization (2020) classified SET as specific type of tumor in the category of malignant fibroblastic and myofibroblastic tumors.

Signs and symptoms
About 80% of pleural SFTs originate in the visceral pleura, while 20% arise from parietal pleura. Although they are often very large tumors (up to 40 cm. in diameter), over half are asymptomatic at diagnosis. While some researchers have proposed that a SFT occupying at least 40% of the affected hemithorax be considered a "giant solitary fibrous tumor", no such "giant" variant has yet been recognized within the most widely used pleural tumor classification scheme.

Some SFTs are associated with the paraneoplastic Doege–Potter syndrome, which is caused by tumor production of IGF-2.

Pathophysiology
Recurrent somatic fusions of the two genes, NGFI-A–binding protein 2 (NAB2) and STAT6, located at chromosomal region 12q13, have been identified in solitary fibrous tumors.

Treatment

The treatment of choice for both benign and malignant SFT is complete en bloc surgical resection.

Prognosis
Prognosis in benign SFTs is excellent. About 8% will recur after first resection, with the recurrence usually cured after additional surgery.

The prognosis in malignant SFTs is much more guarded. Approximately 63% of patients will have a recurrence of their tumor, of which more than half will succumb to disease progression within 2 years. Adjuvant chemotherapy and/or radiotherapy in malignant SFT remains controversial.

History
SFT was first mentioned in the scientific literature by Wagner. The first discussion of its clinical and pathological properties was by Klemperer and Rabin. SFTs have also been known as hemangiopericytomas although this term has now been discontinued from WHO tumor classifications.

Over the years pleural SFTs acquired a number of synonyms, including localized fibrous tumor, benign mesothelioma, localized
fibrous mesothelioma, submesothelial fibroma, and pleural fibroma. The use of names that include ‘mesothelioma’ for this tumor is discouraged because of potential confusion with diffuse malignant mesothelioma, a much more serious disease.

See also
 Hemangiopericytoma
 Myopericytoma

Additional images

References

External links 

  World Health Organization Classification of Tumours. Pathology and Genetics of Tumours of the Lung, Pleura, Thymus and Heart. (Download Page)

Pleura neoplasia